Sihaung may refer to the following places in Myanmar:

Sihaung Ashe
Sihaung Myauk
Sihaung Taung